Jawahar Navodaya Vidyalaya, Mundali Cuttack (also JNV Mundali or JNV Cuttack) is a government residential school located in Mundali village in Cuttack district, India. It is part of the Jawahar Navodaya Vidyalaya network and is managed by Navodaya Vidyalaya Samiti, an autonomous organization of the Ministry of Human Resource Development and Department of Secondary Education and Higher Education.

The Navodaya Vidyalaya Scheme was started in 1985 as part of the new education policy of the Government of India under Prime Minister Rajiv Gandhi to set up schools for children with special talents to progress at a faster pace irrespective of their capacity to pay for it.

External links
 Official Website

Jawahar Navodaya Vidyalayas in Odisha
Cuttack district
Educational institutions established in 1986
1986 establishments in Orissa